The bladder fiddle was a folk instrument used throughout Europe and in the Americas. The instrument was originally a simple large stringed fiddle (a musical bow) made with a long stick, one or more thick gut strings, and a pig's-bladder resonator. It was bowed with either a notched stick or a horsehair bow.

Changes in the instrument have produced two distinct variations. Besides the bowed instrument which has been preserved in the 21st century in Lithuania (and possibly Estonia and Flanders), a percussion instrument is used widely internationally, including Europe, North America and Australia.

Evolution from fiddle to drum set
The instrument was originally a fiddle. It used a flexible stick, a musical bow, as the instrument's body and neck. The resonator, at first an inflated animal bladder, was held between the stick and the bowstring. Versions in Poland, Lithuania and the Netherlands had as many as three strings, but pictures of the Flanders fiddle and the Nocturnal Serenade by Jan Steen show monochords (single-stringed instruments). In this configuration, the fiddle is played by drawing the bow over the string or strings; pressing down on the string changes the note. Having multiple strings allows a fiddler to accompany other instruments with simple patterns using one, two or three notes from open strings. Some variants of the instrument show a flexible stick, making the bowed-instrument a musical bow. Others, such as the Estonian and Lithuanian instruments, have rigid sticks, making the instrument a bar or stick zither.

The instrument changed in some places. While the pig-bladder instrument can still be found in Lithuania today, in Holland the pig's bladder had been replaced by 1675 by a drum-like circle, wedged between the stick and a single gutstring, which resonated when the string was bowed. That version, the bumbass, was illustrated in the painting Nocturnal Serendade, by Dutch painter Jan Steen.

Immigrants to the United States brought the bumbass with them. In America, it used by the  Pennsylvania Dutch culture of eastern Pennsylvania, United States, and still exists today, as the boomba, a percussion instrument. It may also be seen in  Texas, at events celebrating local German heritage (such as the Tomball German Heritage Festival).

On percussion instruments, the drum has been turned sideways on the instrument and the string runs across it like the sound-table on a spike lute. The string has been dropped in some cases, the bow stick becoming a drumstick and the instrument now a percussion instrument, called a boomba, stamp fiddle, stumpf fiddle, or pogo cello. Also called Devil's stick, Devil's violin, boom bass, hum strum, teufel stick or stomp stick. In the percussion instrument, the string may still have limited use as a chordophone, if it has been set up with a tuning peg to tighten the string; if used in this manner, the instrument is bowed with a notched stick, producing rough sounds. In some modern instruments, the string has been replaced by a long spring, solely a percussion instrument, and in other instruments the string has been dropped altogether. The Polish  (Devil's fiddle) often has no string, but includes the memory of the instrument's past, by placing a violin-shaped piece of wood on the instrument.

This percussion version of the instrument is international, being used in Denmark (called the Rumsterstang or the krigsdjaevel) and Germany as well as the United States. Boomba is highly likely to have come from German Bumbaß [pronounced "BOOM-bahss"]; bum possibly coming from an older form of brummen ("to hum") and baß ("bass", as in music).

During World War I, German soldiers made Stumpf fiddles or Teufelsgeiges, replacing the pig's bladder with a tin can for the resonator, and bowing with a notched stick. Other bowed instruments were created using a wooden box for the resonator.

Today, there are two types of the instrument, bowed and percussion. The Stumpf fiddle became a percussion instrument, beaten with a stick and stamped on the ground to shake attached wrattles, bells and cymbals. The instrument may have a string, or not. It is also called Devil's stick, pogo cello, boom-ba, boom bass, hum strum, devil's violin, teufel stick.

Other names
It is known under different names; in Germany it was called the bumbass, Teufelsgeige (devil's fiddle) or Bettelgeige (beggar's fiddle). In Germany sometimes a bell or cymbal was added to the top for decoration or additional sound.  In Austria it was called the saubass, in Spanish the rabel.

In France it is the basse de Flandre (Flanders fiddle), and in England a drone, "drone and string" or bladder fiddle.  In England it was used by traveling musicians. In Venezuela, the bladder fiddle is known as "marimba, tarimba, guarumba, guasdua, and carangano".  The name in Latvian is pūšļa vijole. In Lithuania, the instrument is the Pūslinė.

Slavic instrument
The Slavic peoples have a musical bow (Słowiański łuk muzyczny in Polish) which is pictured as having three strings (trzy struny).

Gallery
Hornbostel-Sachs classification are first in captions, then place and date.

Modern bowed instrument

The original pig-bladder instrument is still played with a bow in Lithuania as a traditional folk instrument, called a Pūslinė. Estonia has one as well, called the põispill. The instrument has between 1-3 strings and can be tuned with tuning pegs.

Modern percussion instrument

The modern boomba focuses heavily on loud percussion, typically consisting of a variety of percussion instruments attached to a wooden pole. The exact designs of a boomba vary, with much emphasis being put on the personalization of the boomba. Common features typically include a spring-loaded rubber base (much like a pogo stick), with percussion instruments such as bells and wood blocks attached. Boombas often also include a set of cymbals which crash as the boomba is bounced, and a tambourine which can be played with a drumstick or shaken as the boomba is played.

The boomba is similar in nature to the "stumpf fiddle", though the stumpf fiddle generally lacks the loud crashing cymbal on top.  It is this loud crash when bounced that makes the boomba distinct. An older, German variant of the stumpf fiddle and the boomba is the Teufelsgeige, which is decorated with a Devil's head at the top of the pole.

See also
Bladder pipe
Bar zither
 Estonian instrument, percussion "umba"

References

Anthony C. Baines. "Bumbass", Grove Music Online, ed. L. Macy (accessed August 20, 2006), grovemusic.com (subscription access).

Further reading
Anthony C. Baines. "Bumbass", Grove Music Online, ed. L. Macy (accessed August 20, 2006), grovemusic.com (subscription access).
 They're Happy They Play The Boomba And They're Dears. August 5, 1999, by Kathy Lauer-Williams, The Morning Call
 StumpFiddle.net (website down, archived link)
 Chip Bailey's Amazing Stumpf Fiddle Demonstration  at YouTube.com

External links
Picture of Estonian Poispillids being played, from 1979
Music video with two-string bladder fiddle from Eastern Europe,  appears to uses inflated bladder or close-looking substitute.
The bumbass, lagerphone, and tromba marina connection - Jon Rose Web - Includes bumbass audio

Bass monochords
American musical instruments
Music of Pennsylvania
German musical instruments
French musical instruments
English musical instruments
Belgian musical instruments
Estonian musical instruments
Lithuanian musical instruments
Polish musical instruments